The Unity Bridge 2 is an international bridge and border crossing between Kivikoni, Songea Rural District in Tanzania and Lupilichi in Mozambique.

References

Ruvuma River
Mozambique–Tanzania bridges
Bridges in Tanzania
Bridges in Mozambique
Mozambique–Tanzania relations
Buildings and structures in Niassa Province
Buildings and structures in the Ruvuma Region